Clubul Sportiv Muresul Târgu Mureș, formerly known as CS Mureșul or  SC Mureșul Târgu Mureș, is a women's handball team based in Târgu Mureș, Romania that competes in the Divizia A.

Honours

Domestic competitions 
 Liga Națională
 Winners (1): 1988
 Second place: 1980, 1987, 1989
 Third place: 1966, 1981
 Cupa României
 Winners (2): 1987, 1988
 Finalist: 1987

European competitions
 European Champions Cup: 
 Third place: 1989

Former players
  Angela Bloj
  Sabine Klimek
  Eszter Mátéfi
  Éva Mózsi
  Rozalia Șooș

Former coaches
  Eugen Bartha
  Gheorghe Ionescu
  Árpád Kameniczki
  Ladislau Kulcsár 
  Valentin Szabó-Pop

See also
 Progresul Târgu Mureș (women's handball) - Handball 11s

References

Liga Națională (women's handball) clubs
Handball clubs established in 1959
Handball clubs established in 2018
Sport in Târgu Mureș